King Solomon's Ring is a general-audience zoological book, written by Austrian scientist Konrad Lorenz in 1949. The first English-language edition was published in 1952.

The English title refers to the legendary Seal of Solomon, a ring that supposedly gave King Solomon the power to speak to animals. Lorenz claimed to have achieved this feat of communication with several species, by raising them in and around his home and observing their behavior. King Solomon's Ring describes the methods of his investigation and his resulting conclusions about animal psychology.

References
Konrad Lorenz (1961) King Solomon's Ring  Translated by Marjorie Kerr Wilson. Methuen, London. 202 pages. 

1949 non-fiction books
Zoology books
Works by Konrad Lorenz